Coprinellus truncorum is a species of mushroom-forming fungus in the family Psathyrellaceae. Part of the cluster of mushrooms morphologically related to Coprinellus micaceus, this species can be distinguished from C. micaceus by a smooth, rather than pruinose (powdery) stipe, and by having more elliptical spores. Although not conclusively proven, this species may be conspecific with C. micaceus.

References

truncorum
Fungi described in 1772